Speed is an unincorporated community in Palestine Township, Cooper County, Missouri, United States.

Geography
Speed is located along Missouri Route F on the west bank of Stephens Branch of Petite Saline Creek, four miles north of Bunceton. Boonville is nine miles to the north-northeast. The community of Bellair is two miles to the west on Missouri Route 5.

History
Speed was originally named New Palestine, and under the latter name was laid out in 1868.  The present name is after Austin Speed, a railroad official. A post office called New Palestine was established in 1869, the name was changed to Speed in 1898, and the post office closed in 1955.

References

Unincorporated communities in Cooper County, Missouri
Unincorporated communities in Missouri